Mathias Vicherat (born 26 May 1978) is a French civil servant and director of Sciences Po since 22 November 2021.

Early life 
He was born in 1978 in Seine-Saint-Denis. His father worked for Fnac.

Professional career 
In September 2010, Vicherat became the deputy director of the cabinet for the Mayor of Paris, succeeding François Blouvac. In 2012, he replaced Nicolas Revel as Cabinet Director of Bertrand Delanoë.

Vicherat maintained his post after the election of Anne Hidalgo as Mayor of Paris in 2014.

Sciences Po 
On 10 November 2021, he was elected by the administrative council of the Fondation nationale des sciences politiques. He was named Director of the l'Institut d'études politiques de Paris (Sciences Po) and administrator of Fondation nationale des sciences politiques by a decree from the President of France and an order of the Minister of Higher Education, Research and Innovation.

Personal life 
From 2013-2021, he was in a relationship with journalist Marie Drucker. They have a son.

References 

1978 births
Living people
Sciences Po alumni
École nationale d'administration alumni
French academic administrators
People from Les Lilas
SNCF people
French civil servants